Alfred German Archer (6 December 1871 in Richmond, Surrey, England – 15 July 1935 in Seaford, Sussex, England) was a cricketer who played for Worcestershire in 1900 and 1901. Archer also played one Test match for Lord Hawke's XI England on their 1898–99 tour to South Africa: this was his first appearance in first-class cricket. He also played for Incogniti (1897–1900), and I Zingari (1903).

Although Archer was a wicket-keeper, he did not keep wicket or bowl in the Test match in which he played, and he batted at number 10. Overall, Archer had an undistinguished career: he did not even get into the first XI at his school at Haileybury. Archer also turned out for the Marylebone Cricket Club and for minor counties Worcestershire, and Shropshire between 1894 and 1903 while playing at club level for Ludlow.

References

External links

1871 births
1935 deaths
People from Richmond, London
English cricketers
England Test cricketers
Worcestershire cricketers
Marylebone Cricket Club cricketers
People educated at Haileybury and Imperial Service College
P. F. Warner's XI cricketers